William Taylor (April 5, 1788 – January 17, 1846) was a nineteenth-century congressman and lawyer from Virginia.

Biography
Born in Alexandria, Virginia, Taylor completed preparatory studies, studied law and was admitted to the bar, commencing practice in Staunton, Virginia. He later moved to Lexington, Virginia, where he continued his law practice and became the commonwealth attorney for the county court of Rockbridge County, Virginia, serving from 1817 to 1843 and the commonwealth attorney for the circuit court of Pocahontas County, Virginia (now West Virginia) from 1817 to 1843. Taylor was a member of the Virginia House of Delegates in 1821 and was elected a Democrat to the United States House of Representatives in 1842, serving from 1843 until his death in 1846. There, he was chairman of the Committee on Accounts from 1843 to 1846. Taylor died on January 17, 1846, in Washington, D.C. and was interred there in Congressional Cemetery.

See also
 Thomas S. Hinde, brother-in law.
 Thomas Hinde, father-in-law.
 List of United States Congress members who died in office (1790–1899)

External links

1788 births
1846 deaths
Burials at the Congressional Cemetery
County and city Commonwealth's Attorneys in Virginia
Democratic Party members of the Virginia House of Delegates
Politicians from Alexandria, Virginia
People from Lexington, Virginia
People from Pocahontas County, West Virginia
Politicians from Staunton, Virginia
Virginia lawyers
West Virginia lawyers
Democratic Party members of the United States House of Representatives from Virginia
19th-century American politicians
Lawyers from Alexandria, Virginia
19th-century American lawyers